The 2008 Air Canada Cup was the sixth edition of the women's ice hockey tournament. It was held from January 2-6, 2008 in Ravensburg, Germany. The Canadian U22 national team won the tournament by defeating Finland in the final.

Tournament

First round

Group A

Group B

Final round

5th place game

Semifinals

3rd place game

Final

External links
Tournament on hockeyarchives.info

2008–09
2008–09 in women's ice hockey
2008–09 in Swiss ice hockey
2008–09 in German ice hockey
2008–09 in Canadian women's ice hockey
2008–09 in Finnish ice hockey
2008–09 in Russian ice hockey
2008–09 in Swedish ice hockey
2008